Blagoje is a masculine Slavic name derived from the roots blag ("gentle, mild") and -oje. It is recorded in Serbia since the Middle Ages. It may refer to:

Blagoje Adžić (1932–2012), the acting minister of defence in the Yugoslav government
Blagoje Bersa (1873–1934), Croatian musical composer
Blagoje Bratić (1946–2008), Bosnian Serb former football player
Blagoje Marjanović (1907–1984), Serbian football forward
Blagoje Parović (1903–1937), politician
Blagoje Paunović (1947–2014), former Serbian football defender
Blagoje Simić (born 1960), Serbian war criminal sentenced by the International Criminal Tribunal for the Former Yugoslavia
Blagoje Vidinić (1934–2006), footballer and football coach

See also
Blagojević, Serbo-Croatian surname
Blagoy, Bulgarian name
Blagoj, Macedonian name
Blagoev, Bulgarian surname

References

Sources

Slavic masculine given names
Serbian masculine given names
Slovene masculine given names
Croatian masculine given names
Macedonian masculine given names
Ukrainian masculine given names
Montenegrin masculine given names